Lekvan (also Romanized as Lekvān; also known as Līkvān) is a village in Sanjabad-e Jonubi Rural District, Firuz District, Kowsar County, Ardabil Province, Iran. At the 2006 census, its population was 74, in 14 families.

References 

Tageo

Towns and villages in Kowsar County